ColorZilla is a Google Chrome and Mozilla extension that assists web developers and graphic designers with color related and other tasks.

ColorZilla allows getting a color reading from any point in the browser, quickly adjusting this color and pasting it into another program, such as Photoshop. 

The extension allows zooming Web pages and measuring distances between any two points on the page. The built-in palette browser allows choosing colors from pre-defined color sets and saving the most used colors in custom palettes. DOM spying features allow getting various information about DOM elements.

Features
Multiplatform - Microsoft Windows, Linux, and Mac OS X
Eyedropper 
Color picker
Page zooming
Palette viewer and editor (GIMP compatible)
History and Favorites palette
Page Pan 
Displays element information (tag name, class, id, size)
Outline DOM elements
RGB, HSV, and HTML colors support
Auto copy 
Launch DOM Inspector 
Distance measurements

See also
Firefox
Color tool

References

New edition of Firefox a sham; build a better browser yourself, The Daily Orange, September 5, 2007

External links
Official Website
ColorZilla at Mozilla Add-ons
Best Google Chrome Extensions

Nonfree Firefox WebExtensions
Color
2012 software